Hägg is a Swedish surname. Hägg is also the Swedish name for the bird cherry (Prunus padus),  a species of cherry native to northern Europe. Hägg was commonly included on the listing of soldier's names taken from nature. Hägg may refer to:

People

 Carina Hägg (b. 1957), Swedish Social Democratic politician 
 Göran Hägg (1947–2015), Swedish author and critic 
 Gunder Hägg (1918–2004), Swedish runner and multiple world record breaker of the 1940s
 Gustaf Hägg (1867–1925), Swedish organist and composer
 Jacob Adolf Hägg (1850–1928), Swedish composer
 Mia Hägg (b. 1970), Swedish architect based in Paris, France
 Robert Hägg, Swedish hockey player

See also
 Hagg (disambiguation)

Swedish-language surnames